Mark Haigh-Hutchinson (20 August 1964 – 15 January 2008) was an English video game developer. He is most notable for working on Zombies Ate My Neighbors, mid to late 1990s Star Wars titles, and the Metroid Prime games.

Biography
Haigh-Hutchinson started his career at Artic Software, but moved to Vortex Software in 1984. In 1986, he left Vortex for Elite Systems, where he ported Paperboy to the Amstrad CPC. He then later worked at Tiertex. In 1989, he was hired by LucasArts, where he worked until 1999, mostly on Star Wars video games. Since 2000, he worked at Retro Studios, where he developed the camera system for the Metroid Prime series.

On 15 January 2008 Haigh-Hutchinson died in Austin, Texas after battling pancreatic cancer, at the age of 43. He is survived by his wife, son, and daughter.

Works

Video games
Android One (1984)
Highway Encounter (1985)
Alien Highway (1986)
Revolution (1986)
Paperboy (1987) - Amstrad CPC port
Overlander (1988)
Thunder Blade (1988)
Human Killing Machine (1988) (a semi-official sequel to Street Fighter)
Indiana Jones and the Last Crusade: The Action Game (1989)
World Cup Italia '90 (1990)
Magic Boy (1993)
David Robinson's Supreme Court (1993)
Star Wars: Rebel Assault (1993)
Sam & Max Hit the Road (1993)
Zombies Ate My Neighbors (1993)
Big Sky Trooper (1995)
Star Wars: Dark Forces (1995)
Shadows of the Empire (1996)
Star Wars: Rogue Squadron 3D (1998)
Star Wars: Episode I Racer (1999)
Metroid Prime (2002)
Metroid Prime 2: Echoes (2004)
Metroid Prime 3: Corruption (2007)

Books
Real-Time Cameras (2008), Morgan Kaufmann,

Sources
Obituary at IGN
Interview at TACGR, 1995
Mark Haigh-Hutchinson at MobyGames

1964 births
2008 deaths
British video game designers
Deaths from pancreatic cancer
Deaths from cancer in Texas